Washington v. Davis, 426 U.S. 229 (1976), was a United States Supreme Court case that established that laws that have a racially discriminatory effect but were not adopted to advance a racially discriminatory purpose are valid under the U.S. Constitution.

Facts
Two black applicants for positions in the Washington, D.C. police department were turned down. Suing, they claimed that the Department used racially discriminatory hiring procedures, including its use of a test of verbal skills (Test 21), which was failed disproportionately by blacks. The plaintiffs sued the department, alleging that the test constituted impermissible employment discrimination under both Title VII of the Civil Rights Act of 1964 and the U.S. Constitution.

Since the respondents were filing the action in Washington, D.C., a federal territory, not a state, the constitutional provision the plaintiffs sued under was the Due Process Clause of the Fifth Amendment instead of the Equal Protection Clause of the Fourteenth Amendment. The Equal Protection Clause directly applies only to the states, but the Supreme Court ruled in Bolling v. Sharpe that the Due Process Clause of the Fifth Amendment, which applies to the federal government, contains an equal protection component.

Judgment
The Supreme Court held that under the Constitution's Equal Protection Clause, "a law or other official act, without regard to whether it reflects a racially discriminatory purpose, [is not] unconstitutional solely because it has a racially disproportionate impact." A plaintiff must prove discriminatory motive on the part of the state actor to receive redress under the Constitution, not just discriminatory impact. It held a "disproportionate impact is not irrelevant, but it is not the sole touchstone of an invidious racial discrimination forbidden by the Constitution."

The Court also examined whether Test 21 had a discriminatory effect. After applying the disparate impact analysis, it held that Test 21 did not have a discriminatory effect on blacks. The Court held that the Court of Appeals had erroneously assumed that the stricter, effects-based "disparate impact" test, under Title VII of the Civil Rights Act of 1964, existed under the Constitution's Equal Protection Clause as well. The Court pointed out that the Washington, D.C., police department had gone to significant lengths to recruit black officers. In the years since the case was brought before the trial court, the ratio of blacks on the police force to blacks in the community had nearly evened out.

Justice White said the following:

Justices Brennan and Marshall dissented. They would have held that the constitutional questions would not be reached and that the question should have first been decided on statutory grounds in the employees' favor.

Significance
The purpose-based standard made it much more difficult for plaintiffs to prevail in discrimination suits arising under the Constitution. Unlike the Constitution, Title VII of the Civil Rights Act of 1964 was interpreted in Griggs v Duke Power Co., 401 US 424 (1971) to prohibit employment practices that have a racially disparate impact irrespective of whether they were adopted with a discriminatory purpose.

In the years following Washington, the Court held that laws must be motivated by purposeful discrimination, not just have a discriminatory effect, to be unconstitutional. In Personnel Administrator of Massachusetts v Feeney 442 US 256 (1979) held legislation obnoxious to the Equal Protection Clause is passed "because of, not merely in spite of, its adverse effects upon an identifiable group."

In Mobile v. Bolden, the Court cited Washington in holding that the Fifteenth Amendment prohibited racially discriminatory voting laws only if they were adopted with a racially discriminatory purpose. That principle was affirmed again in McCleskey v. Kemp, 481 U.S. 279 (1987), which held that criminal statutes are invalid under the Equal Protection Clause only if they were adopted with a discriminatory purpose.

In 1991, Congress amended Title VII of the Civil Rights Act of 1964 and codified the "disparate impact" test, established in Griggs v. Duke Power Co. and its progeny, which allows employees to sue their employers (including governmental entities) for racial discrimination irrespective of discriminatory purpose. Justice Scalia argued in his concurrence in Ricci v. DeStefano'' that the disparate impact provisions of Title VII should be unconstitutional under the Equal Protection Clause.

See also

 List of United States Supreme Court cases, volume 426

References

External links
 
 

United States Supreme Court cases
United States equal protection case law
1976 in United States case law
United States Supreme Court cases of the Burger Court
Metropolitan Police Department of the District of Columbia